Rushere is a town in Kiruhura District in the Western Region of Uganda.

Location
The coordinates of Rushere are 0°12'41.0"S, 30°56'12.0"E (Latitude:-0.211385; Longitude:30.936655).

Points of interest
The following points of interest lie within the town limits or close to the edges of Rushere:
Rushere Fc Vs Ntonda Fc 10-05-2018
Rutger Ivan kent (Obama) this Rushere is his address 
Rushere Football Club kiruhura and His Manager Gumisiriza Elly 
 Asiimwe Computer Services Ltd, Stationery & Printing, Financial Services, P.O. Box 22, Rushere, Kiruhura.
 offices of Rushere Town Council
 Rushere Community Hospital, a 200-bed community hospital affiliated with the Church of Uganda.
 Rushere central market
 factory and offices of Vital Tomosi Dairy Limited, a dairy processing company.
Kent video club I have best Korean drama and Chinese series
Victoria Kent muzungu lives here at kaggwa and Jalia her parents 16 years now

References

.Rushere Football club is biggest football team in kiruhura 
.Rutger Ivan kent (Obama) is The Rushere Fc social media publisher

External links
Webpage of Kiruhura District Administration

Populated places in Western Region, Uganda
Kiruhura District